Thug World Order is the fifth studio album by American hip hop group Bone Thugs-n-Harmony, released on October 29, 2002, and the group's final album for Ruthless Records. Singles released were "Money, Money", "Get Up & Get It" (featuring 3LW), and "Home" featuring Phil Collins, which charted in the UK.

Flesh-n-Bone did not appear on the album due to his incarceration on weapons charges, while Bizzy Bone was ejected from the group after the album's release.

Critical reception

Like their previous effort BTNHResurrection, Thug World Order received more favorable to positive reviews from music critics. William Ruhlmann of Allmusic gave the album two and a half stars out of a possible five, stating "Bone Thugs-N-Harmony are a good example of a group that has become little more than a brand name as its various members devote more of their time to solo projects. Thug World Order is only their fourth proper album in seven years, although many solo albums and recordings by other configurations have emerged during the period. By now, however, every album by the group seems like a reunion effort, their last one being dubbed BTNHResurrection, while, on this album, one of the members mutters unconvincingly, "I ain't gonna say we back, 'cause we never left...." The group's musical approach hasn't changed much, its raps offset by vocal harmonies and its musical beds anchored by samples as surprising as Phil Collins' "Take Me Home." Lyrically, their concerns are also much the same, extending from boasting and reflections on life in the 'hood to complaints about low-quality drugs ("Bad Weed Blues") and the duplicitousness of women with whom they have had sex ("Not My Baby"). But their attention seems distracted, especially when they interrupt the proceedings with commercials for their upcoming solo projects, and the album's disappointing initial commercial reception suggested that their audience wasn't paying close attention, either." Jon Caramanica gave the album a positive "B" rating stating "”How many thugs get down like us and still harmonize like the great Temptations?” the Cleveland foursome wonder on ”Guess Who’s Back.” Bone Thugs-N-Harmony have crooned lazy, tuneful hip-hop for a decade, and their fifth CD continues the psychedelia apace. They are the rare rappers who can sample Phil Collins, drop a Jeffrey Osborne riff, and praise God without seeming a bit less hard." Rolling Stone rated the album three and a half stars out of five.

Track listing
Credits adapted from the album's liner notes.

Sample credits
 "T.W.O. Intro" contains an interpolation of "Love on a Two-Way Street", written by Bert Keyes and Sylvia Robinson.
 "Guess Who's Back?" contains an interpolation of "My Boyfriend's Back", written by Bob Feldman, Gerald Goldstein, and Richard Gottehrer.
 "Home" contains a sample of "Take Me Home", written and performed by Phil Collins.
 "Get Up & Get It" contains a sample of "Offer I Can't Refuse", written by Stephen Shockley, as performed by Klymaxx.
 "Money, Money" contains a sample of "I Ain't Got Nothin'", written and performed by Dutch Robinson.
 "Not My Baby" contains an interpolation of "You Can Call Me Crazy", written by Timmy Gatling, Gene Griffin, Aaron Hall III, and Teddy Riley, as performed by Guy.
 "Cleveland Is the City" contains an interpolation of "Cleveland Rocks", written by Ian Hunter.

Charts

Certifications

References

Ruthless Records albums
Bone Thugs-n-Harmony albums
Albums produced by L.T. Hutton
Albums produced by Bosko
2002 albums